The Hartford Hawks men's basketball team is the basketball team that represents University of Hartford in West Hartford, Connecticut. The school's team currently competes as an Independent. In 2008, Hartford made the America East tournament championship game falling to UMBC 65–82. In 2021, they defeated UMass Lowell, 64–50, to make their first NCAA Division I Tournament.

On May 6, 2021, the University of Hartford Board of Regents voted to drop its athletic department to Division III. The drop is set to take place no later than September 1, 2025.

The most notable basketball player to play for Hartford is Vin Baker, who played parts of 14 seasons in the NBA, was named to four All-Star Games, and won a gold medal for the United States men's basketball team at the 2000 Sydney Olympics. Hartford has retired his jersey.

Facilities
Hartford plays their home games at Chase Arena at Reich Family Pavilion. In 2015 the men's locker room was expanded and refurbished.

Head coaches
 A. Peter LoMaglio (1949–1955)
 Abe Silverman (1955–1957)
 Roy Spear (1957–1962)
 Gordon McCullough (1962–1976)
 Garry Palladino (1976–1981)
Jack Phelan (1981–1992)
Paul Brazeau (1992–2000)
Larry Harrison (2000–2006)
Dan Leibovitz (2006–2010). 
John Gallagher (2010–2022)
Tom Devitt (interim; 2022–present)

Yearly results

|-style="background: #ffffdd;"
| colspan="6" align="center" | Division I

Postseason

NCAA Division I Tournament results
The Hawks have appeared in the NCAA Division I Tournament once. Their record is 0–1.

NCAA Division II Tournament results
The Hawks have appeared in the NCAA Division II Tournament four times. Their combined record is 2–5.

CIT results
The Hawks have appeared in the CollegeInsider.com Postseason Tournament (CIT) two times. Their combined record is 0–2.

References

External links